The Cristalino State Park is a state park in the state of Mato Grosso, Brazil.

Location

The Cristalino State Park is in the municipalities of Alta Floresta and Novo Mundo in the extreme north of Mato Grosso, between the Teles Pires river and the border with the state of Pará.
Most of the park is in Novo Mundo but part of the extreme west of the park is in Alta Floresta.
The park is on the border of the "arc of deforestation" in the Amazon rainforest.
In the north it borders the Brazilian Airforce base in Pará, which contains a large area of native vegetation.
The state park is surrounded by farms to the west, east and south.

The  Cristalino River enters the park from Pará to the north, then flows westward through the park below the Pará border before turning south and flowing to the Teles Pires in the southwest.
The Serra do Mateiro is in the west of the park.
The Rochedo River rises in the east of the park, flowing through the Serra do Rochedo on the park's south boundary.
The Nhandú River defines the eastern boundary of the park.
The park is accessible by water via the Teles Pires River to the mouth of the Cristalino River, then up that river through the park.

The park can also be reached by the unpaved Quarta Leste road from the municipal center of Alta Floresta, taking a ferry across the Teles Pires River. The road runs through the park as far as the Cristalino River. 
Another dirt road from the Primeira Leste highway runs parallel to the boundary with Pará to the Cristalino River.
Unofficial roads opened by ranchers and loggers enter the eastern end of the park, but do not reach the Cristalino River basin.
SEMA has a station for researchers and students, including a house with four bedrooms, one bathroom and a power generator.

Environment

The park is in the ecotone or transition zone between Amazon rainforest and cerrado.
The reserve would be in the proposed South Amazon Ecotones Ecological Corridor.
Vegetation includes rainforest, seasonal forest, campinarana, rocky fields and pioneer fluvial or lacustrine formations.
515 species of birds have been recorded, with 55 endemic species, 43 of reptiles, 29 of amphibians, 36 of mammals and 16 fish species with commercial or sports value.

Ecotourism, including observation of wildlife and hiking, generates some income and may help encourage sustainable environmental development in the surrounding area.
However, the park has been threatened since the time of its creation with land clearance for cattle pasture, illegal logging and construction of infrastructure such as small hydroelectric plants.
Little has been done to prevent damage to the environment, and there is lack of local community support for the park.
Threats include illegal logging, which has steadily advanced north into the park, family agriculture producing annual crops such as rice and beans, and cattle farming.

Legal history

The Cristalino State Park was created on 9 June 2000.
Objectives were to preserve animals and native species of trees threatened with extinction.
The Cristalino II State Park was created by decree 2.628 of 30 May 2001.
The park is administered by the State Department of the Environment (SEMA).
SEMA has been working with the Cristalino Ecological Foundation, ICV, Forest Institute and UNEMAT to prepare the management plan.
The consultative council was installed in 2007 with representatives of civil society and public organizations.
As of 2016 the park was supported by the Amazon Region Protected Areas Program.

Notes

Sources

State parks of Brazil
Protected areas of Mato Grosso
2000 establishments in Brazil